South Street Halt was a minor station on the Canterbury and Whitstable Railway at Tankerton, Kent. It opened in 1911 and closed in 1931.

History
South Street Halt was opened on 1 June 1911. The single platform halt was provided with a small shelter. The entire struction was built of wood, apart from the shelter, which was clad in corrugated iron. The halt closed on 1 January 1931, when passenger services ceased on the Canterbury and Whitstable Railway. The station was demolished after closure and the trackbed is now part of the Crab and Winkle footpath.

References
Citations

Sources
 
 
 

Disused railway stations in Kent
Former South Eastern Railway (UK) stations
Railway stations in Great Britain opened in 1911
Railway stations in Great Britain closed in 1931
Whitstable
1911 establishments in England
1931 disestablishments in England